Jean-Victor Makengo (born 12 June 1998) is a French professional footballer who plays as a midfielder for  side Lorient.

Club career
Makengo is a youth exponent from SM Caen. He made his Ligue 1 debut on 29 November 2015 against Girondins de Bordeaux. His potential had him linked to top clubs such as both Manchester United and Manchester City. On 31 August 2016, French side FC Lorient made a €5 million bid for the midfielder, refused by Caen.

He scored his first two goals in a professional match against AS Nancy in 4–2 in Coupe de la Ligue. He made 17 appearances in Ligue 1 in the 2016–17 season. At the end of the season, he was called up to France U21 team but missed the matches due to injuries.

On 9 June 2017, Makengo joined French side OGC Nice.

On 25 June 2019, Makengo was loaned to Toulouse for one year with an option to buy.

On 5 October 2020, Makengo joined Udinese for five years, with a transfer fee around €3.5 million.

On 30 January 2023, Makengo signed a 4.5-year contract with Lorient.

Personal life
Born in France, Makengo is of DR Congolese descent. He is a youth international for France.

Career statistics

Club

Honours

International
France U17
UEFA European Under-17 Championship: 2015

References

External links
 France profile at FFF

1998 births
Black French sportspeople
Living people
People from Étampes
Footballers from Essonne
Association football midfielders
French footballers
France youth international footballers
French sportspeople of Democratic Republic of the Congo descent
ESA Linas-Montlhéry players
Stade Malherbe Caen players
OGC Nice players
Toulouse FC players
Udinese Calcio players
FC Lorient players
Ligue 1 players
Serie A players
French expatriate footballers
French expatriate sportspeople in Italy
Expatriate footballers in Italy